is a Japanese actress and model from Tokyo, Japan. Her older sister is the actress and model Miwako Ichikawa.

Biography
Due to her older sister being in the modeling business, Ichikawa made several appearances in the fashion magazine Olive during her teens. She then became a model in 1994 under exclusive contract with the magazine. In 1998, she started modeling for other magazines such as CUTiE, spoon. and Zipper. She made her acting debut in the 1998 short film How To Jujutsu, directed by Takashi Homma. Among the most notable movies she has appeared in are Blue, Cutie Honey, Memories of Matsuko and Shin Godzilla. For her role in Blue she won the award for Best Actress at the 24th Moscow International Film Festival. She was given a Best New Talent award at the 2003 Yokohama Film Festival.

Ichikawa's hobbies are photography and handicrafts.

Filmography

Film
 Timeless Melody (2000) – Chikako
 Blue (2001) – Kayako Kirishima
 A Woman's Work (2002) – Rina
 Lovers' Kiss (2003) – Miki Ozaki
 Pretty Woman (2003)
 Cutie Honey (2004) – Natsuko Aki
 Be with You (2004) – Midori Nagase; Takumi's co-worker
 Animusu anima (2005) – Office lady
 Rampo Noir (2005) segment "Kagami jigoku"
 Memories of Matsuko (2006) – Kumi Kawajiri; Matsuko's sister
 Ten Dreamy Nights (2006) segment 'The 5th Night'
 Life Can Be So Wonderful (2007) – Kanoko
 Megane (2007) 
 Kissho Tennyo (2007) 
 Romantic Prelude (2009)
 Mother Water (2010) – Hatsumi
 Rent-a-Cat (2012) – Sayoko
 Our Family (2014) – Kyōko
 A Living Promise (2016)
 Museum (2016)
 Shin Godzilla (2016) – Hiromi Ogashira
 The Tokyo Night Sky Is Always the Densest Shade of Blue (2017)
 The Third Murder (2017) – Shinohara
 Narratage (2017)
 Destiny: The Tale of Kamakura (2017)
 Hitsuji no Ki (2018) – Yasu Sakurakōji
 A Girl Missing (2019)
 Dad, Chibi is Gone (2019)
 The Voice of Sin (2020) – Ami
 Tang and Me (2022) – Sakurako
 Side by Side (2023) – Shiori

Television
 Psycho Doctor (NTV, 2002)
 Suika (2003) – Shibamoto Yuka
 With the Light (NTV, 2004)
 Kuitan (NTV, 2006)
 Atsuhime (NHK TV, 2008)
 Samurai High School (2009) – Sayaka Miki: Home Room Teacher
 Kenji Miyazawa's Table (Wowow, 2017) – Masajirō Miyazawa
 Unnatural (TBS, 2018)
 Shiroi Kyotō (TV Asahi, 2019) – Natsumi Nosaka
 A Warmed Up Love (TBS, 2020)
 Come Come Everybody (2021–22) – Berry
 DCU (TBS, 2022) – Mako Kuroe

Awards

References

External links
 Official profile 
Jdorama.com

Actresses from Tokyo
Living people
Japanese female models
21st-century Japanese actresses
Japanese film actresses
Japanese television actresses
Year of birth missing (living people)